The International Research and Training Centre for Rural Education (INRULED) is a training and research centre located in the People's Republic of China. The main sponsors of INRULED are the Chinese government and UNESCO.

INRULED's headquarters are located at Beijing Normal University, where the centre's secretariat is located. It also has a base at Baoding, Hebei Province, located 130 km south of Beijing. An Associate Centre is located at the School of Education of the Nanjing Normal University and also at the Gansu Institute of Educational Research. INRULED conducts research and training in the area of rural education in line with the aims of the Education-for-All programme.

The International Research and Training Centre for Rural Education (INRULED) with its explicit focus on rural education is unique. It was formed in the latter part of 1994 through a Memorandum of Agreement signed between the Government of the People's Republic of China and UNESCO. The centre is commissioned to undertake the following functions:
promote international research and development of methods and techniques of rural education; 
promote consultation and cooperation among Member States by devising policies and strategies in the areas of human resource development for rural areas; 
create a wide network for exchange of academic and technical information in the field of rural education among experts in various countries; 
coordinate the cooperative research activities and provide facilities for laboratory research and field work to international experts; 
organize international training workshops, seminars on special subjects and provide fellowships to international researchers; 
produce and disseminate publications and materials on the results of the various research projects undertaken by the centre.

The overall planning and execution of programmes and activities of the centre are supervised, monitored and evaluated by the Government of the People's Republic of China through its National Commission for UNESCO, in co-operation with UNESCO through their Cluster Office in Beijing.

The World Education Forum held in Dakar in April 2000 reaffirmed the critical role education plays for poverty reduction (UNESCO, 2000). Programmes and activities organised by INRULED during the last ten years reflect clearly its fundamental emphasis on the development of better understanding of education, which is a key tool for reducing poverty and improving the lives of rural people, particularly of people who live in the developing and least developed countries.

Over the years INRULED has initiated and facilitated a wide range of programmes and activities focused on rural education which have direct bearing on rural development and poverty reduction with linkages to the mid-term and biennium programmes of UNESCO in literacy, continuing education and primary education within the broader framework of Education-for-All (EFA).  INRULED is inclusive in these programmes and activities in that it has involved practitioners and specialists from around the World with particular emphasis on South-South participation and collaboration. The products and outcomes of these activities are significant and have resulted in many valuable publications (paper and electronic) and informal networking of a wide range of institutions and professionals whose work focus on development of education in rural areas in developing countries.

Since its inception, three International Advisory Board Meetings were convened and three external evaluation missions were mounted (1999, 2001 and 2003). In February 2009 a new management board was established.

The Director is professor Dong Qi
The International Director of INRULED: Prof Zhou Nanzhao
The Deputy Director of INRULED: Prof Wang Li

External links

See also
China Open Resources for Education (CORE)

UNESCO
Education in China
Research institutes in China